{{DISPLAYTITLE:S-Aminoethyl-L-cysteine}}

S-Aminoethyl--cysteine, also known as thialysine, is a toxic analog of the amino acid lysine in which the second carbon of the amino acid's R-group (side chain) has been replaced with a sulfur atom.

Strictly speaking, L-thialysine is actually considered an S-(2-aminoethyl) analogue of L-cysteine. This compound is known to have cytotoxic affects as it inhibits protein synthesis and lysine 2,3-aminomutase.

References

External links
 H-Cys(aminoethyl)-OH·HCl at ChemImpex
 Thialysine at US Biological

Sulfur amino acids
Thioethers
Non-proteinogenic amino acids
Toxic amino acids